Enayam is a village in Killiyoor Block, located within the Kanyakumari District of Tamil Nadu State of India.

Location 
Villages near Enayam include Thengapattanam, Midalam, Painkulam, Killiyur, Thoothoor, and Paloor. Karungal, Kollankodu and Unnamalaikadai are other nearby cities.

The village is bordered by the Munchira and Melpuram Blocks in the north and the Thackalai and Thiruvattar Blocks in the east. It sits near the border of the Kanniyakumari District and Thiruvananthapuram District. It is located on the coast of the Indian Ocean. Enayam Puthenthurai's village code is 227646 and its postal code is 629193. Its postal head office is in Keezhkulam.

Demographics 
As per the 2011 census of India, Enayam Puthenthurai village has a total population of 13,097 people, including 6,650 males and 6,447 females.

The main languages spoken in the village are Tamil and English.

Enayam Puthenthurai Gram panchayat

The Enayam Puthenthurai Gram panchayat (village jury) consists of the Enayam Puthenthurai, Enayam Chinnathurai, Enayam, Helen Nager, and Ramanthurai villages. The Panchayat president is Mary Mallika Vimal Raj from Enayam Puthenthurai.

Enayam International Seaport project 
The Enayam International Seaport is a proposed project planning to reclaim  of land from the sea in three phases.

Because this project could affect the local peoples' livelihood, it was put on hold by the state and central governments of India. It was initially suggested that the project be built in the Colachel or the Enayam area.

For the last three decades, locals have been requesting that the government build a fishing harbor, but the plans to construct a cargo harbor have not changed.

Notable Places in  Enayam Puthenthurai

Schools in Enayam Puthenthurai 

 St. Antony's Primary School
St. Antony's Higher Secondary School
St. Helena High School

Religious Tourist Destinations 
St. Antony's Church
Puthanthurai Jumma Masjid
Nagaraja Temple
Enayam Church

Notable banks 
Indian Bank
State Bank of India
Fishery Community Society banks
Reserve Bank of India

References

Villages in Kanyakumari district